Clan Melville is a Lowland Scottish clan. The clan does not currently have a chief and is therefore considered an Armigerous clan registered with the Lyon Court.

History
The name is derived from the barony of Maleville, in the Pays de Caux region of Normandy, France. Guillaume de Malleville was a companion of William, Duke of Normandy, at the Battle of Hastings in 1066. During the reign of King David I of Scotland, the Melville family were granted lands in Midlothian, which the lands and barony were then named after them.

Castles
The following is a list of castles known to have been in the ownership of the family.
Melville Castle, Midlothian (ancestral seat)
Melville House, Fife (former home of Lord Meville and Earl of Melville)
Glenferness House, Highland (current home of Earl of Leven/Earl of Melville)

References

Armigerous clans